The seventh season of the Chinese reality talent show Sing! China premiered on 5 August 2022. Li Ronghao and Hacken Lee returned as coaches for their fourth and second seasons respectively. In the last season, Liao Changyong was featured as a part-time coach after replacing Na Ying from the Cross Battle round onwards; this season he returned again as a part time coach but was replaced by Coco Lee after the Cross Battle rounds. Fish Leong joined the panel as a new coach this season, replacing Wang Feng from the previous season. 

On 14 October 2022, Liang Yuying was announced the winner of the season, marking Hacken Lee's second win as a coach and the first coach to win multiple consecutive seasons.

Coaches and hosts
On 13 July 2022, it was announced that Li Ronghao and Hacken Lee would both resume their roles as coaches. Liao Changyong was also confirmed to be returning again as a part-time coach and was later replaced by Coco Lee. Fish Leong was announced to join the show as a new coach. Wang Feng was therefore confirmed to have exited the series.

On 17 July 2022, it was announced that Andy Lau would be joining the show as a spectator and part-time host along with Hu Qiaohua.

In addition, the teaching assistant panel was not reinstated this season, leading to the departures of Momo Wu, Jike Junyi, and Zhang Bichen. However, Huang Xiaoyun returned but this time she will be featured as a comeback stage coach alongside season 2 semi-finalist Curley G.

Teams
 Colour key

Blind auditions
For the first time in the show's history, there will be two Comeback Stage coaches paired up as a duo, consisting Huang Xiaoyun and Curley G. They function similar to the Comeback Stage from The Voice franchise. These coaches can choose to retrieve any artist that did not earn a chair turn from any of the main coaches. This indicates that they are saved from being eliminated from the blind auditions.

The same mechanics from the blind auditions last season was implemented. The coaches are to recruit a total of six artists to form a team of their own. The forming of the teams would move to a format that is similar to the "Six-Chair Challenge" featured in the British version of The X Factor. Once a team is full with six artists occupying all the spots, the subsequent artists which the coach has successfully recruited would have to face-off with one of the six artists in the sing-offs for a spot in the team.

The incoming artist may select any of the six defending artists to compete against in the sing-off, and both artists would each sing a new song and the coach would decide on the winner. The winner would be given the spot in the team. However, continuing from last season, the losing artist has the chance to be saved by other coaches (the same function as the steals from The Voice). The coaches are given 10 seconds to save the losing artist for elimination. If one coach presses their button, he/she will be automatically on the new coach's team and if more than one coach presses, same as with the blind auditions, the artist has the opportunity to choose which coach they want.

For defending artists, once they have won a sing-off against an incoming artist, they would receive immunity from the subsequent sing-offs and immediately advance to the next round of the competition.

 Colour key

Episode 1 (5 August)

Episode 2 (12 August)

Episode 3 (19 August)

Episode 4 (26 August)

Episode 5 (2 September)

Episode 6 (9 September)

Sing-off details

Comeback Stage: The Cut
Artists that did not earn a chair turn in the blind auditions can participate in the Comeback Stage if the Comeback Stage coaches press their button. These artists will have to battle it out in a round called The Cut. They may select a successfully recruited artist to sing against. However, they are only allowed to choose artists that received a single chair turn. 

The coaches then choose who is the winner of the battle. The comeback stage coaches' votes will be counted as one. Artists need to garner at least three votes from the coaches to win the battle. For artists that are already on a coach's team, if they win, they would receive immunity and cannot be chosen in any subsequent Cut rounds.

Colour key

The Cross Battles
In this round, coaches will go head-to-head against each other in groups of two. Artists from these respective teams will compete each other in six rounds to decide a winner. After each round of two groups of students singing, a jury of 49 experts (30 domestic Chinese music producers, as well as media elites and radio hosts) voted, and the two coaches not participated in the cross battle each selected the winner and had 1 vote each. The winning artist will receive one point for their team while the other artist will not receive any points. However, coaches may choose one artist on their team to give them an opportunity to earn a bonus point. If that artist wins, they will receive two points for their team; otherwise, the artist will not receive any points.

This season, the rules were slightly changed compared to 2021 season. Instead of coaches selecting their artists at the same time, coaches selected them in turns. After one coach have made up his mind, the other coach has 1 minute to select a member of his team to fight. The first nominating coach was elected after drawing the lots. The team who won the Battle have to nominate first in the next Round.

At the end of the episode, the team that achieved a lower score will have to eliminate one artist from their team as a penalty. 

 Colour key

Episode 7 (16 September)

Episode 8 (23 September)

Knockouts
Knockouts is the next round after the Cross Battles. Compared to last season's Cross Knockouts, artists will fight against the people from the same team, instead of against other teams. Before each knockout, coach selects one artist from his team, who will have randomly assigned opponent. After each group of students sings, their coach will assign 51 points, while the jury will assign 50 points. From each group the contestant with more points will advance to the next round, while the other will be eliminated. The remaining two artists from Fish Leong's team and Coco Lee’s team, that were not drawn, will face off head-to-head for the last spot in the next round.

 Colour key

Episode 9 (30 September)

Episode 10 (3 October)

Playoffs
The Top 11 will perform in the Playoffs for spot in the final. Playoffs are divided into 2 rounds.

In the first round, the remaining artists compete against their fellow team members for a spot in the final. In deciding who moves on, their coach; as well as the studio audience made up of 300 members of the public were given an equal say. Each of the public voters was entitled to one vote per artist, and they can either choose to vote or not vote for a particular artist. The maximum score that the student will receive of their coach is 50, and 50 for the live audience. Artist that will score the most points in each team will advance directly to the final. Remaining artists will perform in round 2.

In the second round, the remaining 7 artists will perform again for the final spot in the final. In this round, only audience will be allowed to vote and artist with the most votes will advance to the final.

 Colour key

Episode 11 (5 October)

Episode 12 (7 October)

The Finals

The final round was recorded on October 14, but premiered on October 28. 

There were two rounds in the final: duet with their coach and a solo song. Participants take turns turning on and off polling channels. Through each round of singing, 51 mass jury votes, each with a maximum of 10 points. The points gathered by the artists in the two rounds will be added up, and the top 2 highest-voted artists will then proceed to the next round, while the other 3 will be eliminated.

In the final stage, there was only one round of solo singing. After the two groups of students sang, 51 members of the public jury and 25 members of the panel voted. Public votes will have 1 vote each, weighing 1 point per vote; panel votes will have 1 vote each, weighing 2 points per vote.

Episode 13 (October 28)

References

2022 in Chinese music
2022 Chinese television seasons